Zhang Jianqi (born 25 March 1946) is a lieutenant general  (zhongjiang) of the People's Liberation Army (PLA) who served as commander of the Jiuquan Satellite Launch Center from 2001 to 2004.

Biography
Zhang was born into a poor peasant family in Cao County, Shandong, on 25 March 1946. In 1964, he was admitted to Harbin Institute of Military Engineering, majoring in nuclear physics. After graduation in 1970, he was assigned to Jiuquan Satellite Launch Center. In 1997, he became deputy commander of the Jiuquan Satellite Launch Center, rising to commander in 2001. He became deputy director of the People's Liberation Army General Armaments Department in 2004, serving in the post until his retirement in July 2009.

References

1946 births
Living people
People from Cao County
People's Liberation Army generals from Shandong
People's Republic of China politicians from Shandong
Chinese Communist Party politicians from Shandong
Delegates to the 11th National People's Congress